The following is a compilation of memorials to the composer Frédéric Chopin in the form of physical monuments and institutions and other entities named after him.

Chopin's Polish residences

Fryderyk Chopin's principal Polish residences survive — most of them rebuilt from the devastations of World War II — except for the Saxon Palace, where his father Mikołaj Chopin in October 1810 (when Fryderyk was six months old) took a post teaching French at the Warsaw Lyceum, housed in the Saxon Palace.  The Chopin family lived on the premises.

In 1817 the Saxon Palace was requisitioned by Warsaw's Russian governor for military use, and the Warsaw Lyceum was reestablished in the Kazimierz Palace (today the rectorate of Warsaw University).  Fryderyk and his family moved to an extant building (center photo, below) adjacent to the Kazimierz Palace.

In 1827, soon after the death of Chopin's youngest sister Emilia, the family moved from the Warsaw University building adjacent to the Kazimierz Palace, to lodgings just across the street from the university, in the south annex of the Krasiński Palace on Krakowskie Przedmieście.  Chopin lived there until he left Warsaw in 1830.  The Krasiński Palace is now the Warsaw Academy of Fine Arts.

Chopin's Żelazowa Wola birthplace, and the Chopin family parlor in Warsaw's Krasiński Palace, are maintained as museums open to the public.

The Saxon Palace was destroyed by the Germans in World War II.  Plans have been put forward to rebuild it.  It was in the Saxon Palace (at the time, the Polish General Staff building) that civilian mathematicians working at the General Staff's Cipher Bureau, beginning in 1932, broke Germany's Enigma machine ciphers—an achievement that would be of great importance to the outcome of World War II.

Physical monuments

Poland
Chopin's heart, preserved in alcohol, was sealed in 1882 within a pillar of the Holy Cross Church, behind a tablet carved by Leonard Marconi.  The tablet bears an inscription from Matthew VI:21: "For where your treasure is, there will your heart be also."  (See photo of the Church pillar, with epitaph.)
 The Holy Cross Church stands only a short distance from Chopin's last Warsaw residence, the Krasiński Palace, which bears a plaque commemorating Chopin.
 There are three Chopin monuments in Żelazowa Wola: an obelisk from 1894, a bronze statue from 1969 and a sandstone bust from 1984.
 There is a monument to Chopin at the Szafarnia manor house where he stayed for holidays with a schoolfriend in 1824 and 1825.
 In 1897 a Chopin memorial was erected in the town of Duszniki-Zdrój, where in 1826, 16-year-old Chopin played his first concert outside of the Russian Partition of Poland. A Chopin statue was erected in 1976 and it stands in the Spa Park in front of the Fryderyk Chopin Theatre.
 In 1926 a bronze statue of Chopin, designed by sculptor Wacław Szymanowski in 1907, was erected in the upper part of Warsaw's Royal Baths (Łazienki) Park.
 Other statues and busts of Chopin stand in Poznań (1923), Wrocław (2004), Żychlin (2010), Antonin, Brdów, Radziejowice, Międzyzdroje, Bydgoszcz (ca. 1973), Słupsk (1976), Ustka (1979), Kraków (2005).
 For the 2010 bicentennial of Chopin's birth, 14 "Chopin's Warsaw" ("Warszawa Chopina") benches were placed in Warsaw near Chopin landmarks. They stand near Chopin landmarks such as the Krasiński Palace, the Carmelite Church where he played organ as a boy, and the Wessel Palace where in 1830 he boarded a stage for Vienna. Pressing a button on a bench makes it play a few bars of a Chopin composition.
Memorial plaques in Warsaw (numerous), Antonin (commemorating two visits to the Radziwiłł Palace), Toruń (commemorating a visit in 1825), Kalisz (commemorating visits in years 1826-1830), Sanniki (commemorating a visit in 1828), Sulechów (commemorating a visit in 1828), Silna (commemorating a visit in 1828), Wrocław (commemorating a concert in 1830), Poznań (on the courtyard of the Poznań Society of Friends of Learning).
Monument in Poturzyn, commemorating a visit in 1830 (1985).
Memorial stones in Kozłowo (commemorating a visit in 1825), Waplewo Wielkie (commemorating a visit and concert in 1827) and Strzyżew.
In 2007, a bronze bust of Frédéric Chopin, the patron of the Polish Baltic Philharmonic, by sculptor Gennady Jerszow was placed in the Philharmonic in Gdańsk.
Obelisks in the Chopin Park in Gliwice (1949) and in Sochaczew (2010).

Europe
France: Chopin's tombstone in Père Lachaise Cemetery, Paris, featuring the muse of music, Euterpe, weeping over a broken lyre, was designed and sculpted by Auguste Clésinger. Monuments to Chopin can also be found in Paris's Parc Monceau (1906) and Jardin du Luxembourg. Also the Salon Frédéric Chopin at the Polish Library in Paris.
United Kingdom: monument and blue plaques in London, monument in Manchester, memorial plaques in Edinburgh and Glasgow
Spain: busts in Valldemossa and Palma de Mallorca, memorial plaque in Barcelona
Germany: statue in Munich's Dichtergarten, memorial plaque in Dresden, bust in Berlin's Hackesche Höfe
Albania: bust in Tirana
Hungary: monument in Gödöllő, bust in Budapest
Serbia: bust in Belgrade
Portugal: bust in Lisbon
Netherlands: bust in Culemborg 
Czech Republic: memorial plaques in Prague and Mariánské Lázně
Austria: memorial plaque in Vienna
Ukraine: tenement house relief in Lviv, memorial plaque in Lutsk
Russia: bust in Kaliningrad

North America
 The Chopin Theatre, Chopin Park, Chopin School, and Chopin Plaza, all in Chicago, are named in the composer's honor – testimony to the influence of Chicago's Polish Community. A Chopin statue is planned for Chicago's lakefront.
 San José, Costa Rica
 Guadalajara, Mexico

Asia

 Hamamatsu (1994)
 Shanghai (2007)
 Singapore (2008)

South America
 Buenos Aires
 Porto Alegre
 Punta del Este
 Rio de Janeiro
 Santiago
 São Paulo

Musical homage
 Sergei Lyapunov, Żelazowa Wola, Op. 37, a symphonic poem composed in 1909 to commemorate Chopin's birth centenary the following year.

Musical institutions

The largest Polish music conservatory is named Fryderyk Chopin University of Music.
The world's oldest monographic music competition, the International Chopin Piano Competition, founded in 1927, is held every five years in Warsaw. Periodically the Grand prix du disque de F. Chopin is awarded for notable Chopin recordings.
The Chopin Festival, founded in 1946, is held annually in the Fryderyk Chopin Theatre in Duszniki-Zdrój.

Chopin societies
International Federation of Chopin Societies
Fryderyk Chopin Society, Warsaw
Chopin Society UK

Museums

The Fryderyk Chopin Museum, established in 1954, is housed in Warsaw's Ostrogski Palace, seat of the Fryderyk Chopin Society. The Museum was refurbished in 2010 for the 200th anniversary of Chopin's birth.
Chopin's Birthplace in Żelazowa Wola is operated as a museum by the Fryderyk Chopin Museum.
The Museum also maintains the Chopin Family Drawing Room in the Krasiński Palace, Warsaw.
 Salon Frédéric Chopin, Paris
 Cell no. 4, Valldemossa Charterhouse, Majorca - the rooms where Chopin and George Sand stayed are laid out as a museum, including Chopin's Pleyel piano.
 The Polish Library in Paris houses a permanent exhibition, the only one in France, dedicated to the composer.

Other

Named for the composer are: 
Warsaw Chopin Airport
the Chopin crater on Mercury
asteroid 3784 Chopin.
Rose "Chopin"

Notes

Sources
Samson, Jim (1996). Chopin. Oxford: Oxford University Press. .

Chopin,memorials